The Cheshire Vase is an annual rugby union knock-out club competition organized by the Cheshire Rugby Football Union, and was introduced during the 2005-06 season with Anselmians being the first ever winners.  The Vase is currently a stand-alone competition open to club sides based in either Cheshire, Merseyside or the Isle of Man that are ranked at tier 6 (North 1 West) and 7 (South Lancs/Cheshire 1) of the English league system.  It is the second most important club competition organized by the Cheshire RFU behind the Cheshire Cup.

The present format is as a knock-out cup with a quarter-final, semi-final and final which is held at a neutral venue during the latter stages of the season (March–May).  At present Cheshire Vase finals are held on the same date and same venue as the Cheshire Bowl final.

Cheshire Vase winners

Number of wins
Northwich (4)
Altrincham Kersal (2)
Sandbach (2)
Wirral (2)
Anselmians (1)
Birkenhead Park (1)
Sale FC (1)
Wilmslow (1)

See also
 Cheshire RFU
 Cheshire Cup
 Cheshire Bowl
 Cheshire Plate
 English rugby union system
 Rugby union in England

References

External links
Cheshire RFU

2005 establishments in England
Recurring sporting events established in 2005
Rugby union cup competitions in England
Rugby union in Cheshire